In fiction, dictatorship has sometimes been portrayed as the political system of choice for controlling dystopian societies in books, video games, TV and movies. Below is a list of fictional dictators.

References

Dictators